Saurauia aequatoriensis is a species of plant in the Actinidiaceae family. It is endemic to Ecuador.  Its natural habitat is subtropical or tropical moist montane forests. It is threatened by habitat loss.

References

Endemic flora of Ecuador
aequatoriensis
Least concern plants
Taxonomy articles created by Polbot